The Great Gold Swindle is a 1984 Australian TV movie based on the Perth Mint Swindle. It was shot on location in Perth.

Plot
In 1982, the brothers Mickelberg are accused of robbing 49 gold bars from a mint in Perth, Western Australia.

Cast
John Hargreaves as Ray Mickelberg
Tony Rickards as Peter Mickelberg
Robert Hughes as Brian Mickelberg
Steve Jodrell as Chris Hunt
Margaret Ford as Peggy Mickelberg
Will Day as Malcolm Mickelberg
Rosemary Harrison as Sheryl Mickelberg
Elaine Baillie as Faye Mickelberg

See also
The Great Mint Swindle, a 2012 telemovie about the mint swindle

References

External links

Australian drama television films
1984 television films
1984 films
Perth Mint Swindle
Australian crime drama films
Films directed by John Power